Hibbertia nutans, commonly known as nodding guinea flower, is a species of flowering plant in the family Dilleniaceae and is endemic to the south-west of Western Australia. It was first formally described in 1863 by George Bentham in Flora Australiensis from specimens collected in 1843 by James Drummond in the Swan River Colony. The specific epithet (nutans) means "nodding". 

Hibbertia nutans grows on rocky granite slopes and on granite rocks in the Avon Wheatbelt and Mallee biogeographic regions of south-western Western Australia.

See also
List of Hibbertia species

References

nutans
Eudicots of Western Australia
Plants described in 1863
Taxa named by George Bentham